Acromyrmex nigrosetosus is a species of leaf-cutter ant, a New World ant of the subfamily Myrmicinae of the genus Acromyrmex. This species is from one of the two genera of advanced attines (fungus-growing ants) within the tribe Attini.

Gallery

See also
List of leafcutter ants

References

Acromyrmex
Insects described in 1899